William Gordon (c. 1735 - 29 March 1776) was an English politician who sat in the House of Commons from 1768 to 1771. 
 
Gordon was High Sheriff of Kent in 1763.

In 1768 Gordon was elected Member of Parliament (MP) for Rochester  and held the seat until 1771 when he resigned by taking Stewardship of the Chiltern Hundreds. He then (in 1772) accepted the post of Commissioner of the Victualling Office.

Gordon lived at a place called Bully Hill at Rochester and died in possession of it in 1776, leaving an only daughter.

References

1730s births
1776 deaths

Year of birth uncertain
Members of the Parliament of Great Britain for English constituencies
British MPs 1768–1774
High Sheriffs of Kent